Bangabandhu Medical College is a Government medical college in Bangladesh. It is located in the Sunamganj District of Sylhet Division, by the side of the Sunamganj – Sylhet road and east part of river Surma.

It offers a five-year medical education course leading to an MBBS degree. Bangabandhu Medical College, Sunamganj  affiliated under Sylhet Medical University for 2020-2021, 2021-2022 session MBBS course.

Location 
Bangabandhu Medical College and Hospital is being constructed in Madanpur area on the west side of Sunamganj-Sylhet road and on the east bank of Surma river (between the road and river).

History 
The Government of Bangladesh built this medical college hospital to ensure the health care of the people of Haor area. Prime Minister Sheikh Hasina approved the project worth Tk 1,107.89 crore at the ECNEC meeting titled 'Bangabandhu Sunamganj Medical College and Hospital'. 50 students who have passed the MBBS admission test in 2020-21 are getting admission in this medical college. The newly constructed Dakshin Sunamganj Upazila Health Complex will conduct lessons for the students of Primary Medical College.

Campus 
On a temporary basis, the newly constructed South Sunamganj Upazila Health Complex will conduct lessons for the students of the Primary Medical College. Education activities will continue in the permanent campus under construction in Madanpur area of Sadar upazila.

A total of 29 modern buildings of Sunamganj Medical College and Hospital are being constructed. Inside it will be a playground and a pond. Among the buildings, a 6-storey hospital building with basement, a 9-storey academic building and a 6-storey hostel building will be constructed. In addition, a 6-storey intern doctors building will be constructed. One 10-storey single doctors accommodation building with 10 storey foundation will be constructed. A 6-storey staff nurse dormitory building with 6 storey foundation will be constructed. A 3-storey laundry building with 3 storey foundation will be constructed. A 4-storey mosque building with 4 storey foundation will be constructed. A 5-storey residential buildings with 5 storey foundation will be constructed. In addition, medical and office equipment and furniture will be collected.

See also 
 List of medical colleges in Bangladesh

References

External links
 Official Website

Colleges in Bangladesh
Educational institutions established in 2021
Health sciences schools in Bangladesh
2021 establishments in Bangladesh
Medical colleges in Bangladesh
Memorials to Sheikh Mujibur Rahman